Carlos Castillo (born April 21, 1975) is a former pitcher in Major League Baseball who played for the Chicago White Sox and Boston Red Sox in part of four seasons spanning 1997–2001.

Career
In a four-season career, Castillo posted a 10–7 record with 130 strikeouts and a 5.04 ERA in 111 appearances, including six starts, 32 games finished, one save, and 210⅔ innings pitched.  

After that, Castillo pitched in the Japanese and Chinese professional baseball leagues. In between, he played winter ball in the Dominican Republic, Puerto Rico and Venezuela.

Additionally, Castillo served as the pitching coach for the South Louisiana Pipeliners of the Continental Baseball League during its 2009 season.

External links

1975 births
American expatriate baseball players in Canada
American expatriate baseball players in Japan
American expatriate baseball players in Taiwan
Atlantic League Road Warriors players
Baseball players from Boston
Birmingham Barons players
Boston Red Sox players
Bridgeport Bluefish players
Brother Elephants players
Calgary Cannons players
Charlotte Knights players
Chicago White Sox players
Fukuoka Daiei Hawks players
Gigantes de Carolina players
Gulf Coast Red Sox players
Gulf Coast White Sox players
Hickory Crawdads players
Joliet JackHammers players
Living people
Long Island Ducks players
Macoto Cobras players
Major League Baseball pitchers
Nashville Sounds players
Navegantes del Magallanes players
American expatriate baseball players in Venezuela
Newark Bears players
Pawtucket Red Sox players
Prince William Cannons players
South Bend Silver Hawks players
South Louisiana Pipeliners players
Tigres del Licey players
American expatriate baseball players in the Dominican Republic
Winston-Salem Warthogs players